The 1978–79 Southern Football League season was the 76th in the history of the league, an English football competition.

Worcester City won the championship, winning their first Southern League title. At the end of the season the Alliance Premier League was established as a new, national top division of non-League football. Thirteen clubs from the Premier Division joined the new league, leading to a restructuring of the Southern League for the next season, in which it was divided solely into Midland and Southern divisions.

Due to the forthcoming changes, there was no relegation or promotion between the Southern League's divisions, although the Premier Division clubs that remained in the Southern League had effectively been relegated one level, being placed in the Midland or Southern divisions the following season. Several clubs left the Division One North at the end of the season to join the Northern Premier League, which had also lost clubs to the new Alliance Premier League, whilst Premier Division club Atherstone Town folded.

Premier Division
The Premier Division consisted of 22 clubs, including 18 clubs from the previous season and four new clubs:
Two clubs promoted from Division One North:
Bridgend Town
Witney Town

Two clubs promoted from Division One South:
Dorchester Town
Margate

At the end of the season most of the Premier Division clubs left the league to join newly created Alliance Premier League. Atherstone Town folded at the end of the season. The rest of the clubs were distributed between newly created Midland and Southern divisions.

League table

Division One North
Division One North consisted of 20 clubs, including 17 clubs from the previous season and three new clubs:
Alvechurch, joined from the West Midlands (Regional) League
Bedford Town, relegated from the Premier Division
Grantham, relegated from the Premier Division

At the end of the season Alliance Premier League on the top of non-league was created. Following that Southern Football League was restructured with Midland and Southern divisions replacing three old divisions. Most of the Division One North clubs were placed to the Midland Division.

League table

Division One South
Division One South expanded up to 21 clubs, including 17 clubs from the previous season and four new clubs:
Dover, relegated from the Premier Division
Dunstable, transferred from the Southern League Division One North
Gosport Borough, promoted from the Hampshire League
Minehead, relegated from the Premier Division

At the end of the season Alliance Premier League on the top of non-league was created. Following that Southern Football League was restructured with Midland and Southern divisions replacing three old divisions. Most of the Division One South clubs were placed to the Southern Division.

League table

Football League election
Runners-up Kettering Town were the only Southern League club to apply for election to the Football League. However, all four Football League clubs were re-elected.

See also
 Southern Football League
 1978–79 Northern Premier League

References

Southern Football League seasons
S